Uppland County, or Upplands län, was a county of the Swedish Empire from 1634 to 1641, and from 1654 to 1714. Between 1641 and 1654, and after 1714, it was split into the Uppsala County and the Stockholm County.

Governors 
Lars Eriksson Sparre av Rossvik (1634-1641)
Lars Claesson Fleming af Liebelitz (1654)
Gustaf Persson Banér (1654-1656)
Svante Svantesson Banér (1656-1660)
Claes Rålamb (1660-1664)
Göran Gyllenstierna (1664-1666)
Axel Axelsson Lillie (1666-1679)
Carl Gabriel Bååt (acting 1678–1679)
Gustaf Lilliecrona (1679-1681)
Lars Claesson Fleming af Liebelitz (1681)
Fabian Wrede af Elimä (1681-1685)
Olof Arvidsson Thegner (1685-1689)
Jakob Gyllenborg (1689-1695)
Johan Hoghusen (1695-1714)

Former counties of Sweden
1634 establishments in Sweden